Neighbor of the Beast or Neighbour of the Beast may refer to any of a number of concepts related to a number near 666, the Number of the Beast

667
 667.. The Neighbour of the Beast, an album by Wig Wam
 667 Dark Avenue, a 66-story building in the 6th installment of the novel series A Series of Unfortunate Events
 667 (The Neighbour of the Beast), a song by The Selecter on the album String Theory
 667, Neighbor of the Beast, a 2006 film by Brain Damage Films

668
 668, the Neighbor of the Beast, a book by Lionel Fenn
 "668:The Neighbour Of The Beast", a song by Richard Holgarth
 668: Neighbour of the Beast, an album by Attila the Stockbroker